Chantal Dumas (born 1959) is a sound artist based in Montreal. She has worked as a composer and improviser through the mediums of radio and sound installation.

Discography
Le parfum des femmes — Das Perfüme der Frauen (OHM / Avatar, AVTR 011, 2000)
Radio Roadmovies with Christian Calon (326music, 326 006/007, 2003)

References

1959 births
Artists from Montreal
Canadian sound artists
Women sound artists
French Quebecers
Living people